Dharur is a village in Vikarabad district of the Indian state of Telangana. It is located in Dharur mandal of Vikarabad revenue division.

Veerabhadreswara Temple

It is a historic temple (History is not known) with 2.5 feet shiv linga, 3.5 feet Veerabhadreshwara statue. Height of the Nandi is 2.5 feet.

References 

Villages in Vikarabad district
Mandal headquarters in Vikarabad district